Malverne is a historic railroad station along the West Hempstead Branch of the Long Island Rail Road. It is officially located at Hempstead Avenue and Utterby Road, in Malverne, New York, and is also parallel to Church Street near Malverne Village Hall. Parking is primarily for those with residential and non-residential permits, but metered parking is available.

History 
Depending on the source, the station was built in either 1909 or February 1913. The station was originally named "Norwood" until it, and the community it serves were renamed Malverne, in order to alleviate confusion with another Norwood, New York in St. Lawrence County. "Norwood" was also the name of a station on the former Southern Hempstead Branch of the South Side Railroad of Long Island. Though not officially considered a historic landmark, it is the oldest surviving station along the West Hempstead Branch.

In February 1955, the LIRR agreed to extend the platform by  so it could accommodate ten-car trains. The footpath across the tracks was moved  to the east.

Station layout
This station has one four-car-long side platform on the east side of the single track.

References

External links

Unofficial LIRR History Website
Malverne Station June 2006 Photo
Steps and ramp to Sheltered Platform
 Station from Hempstead Avenue from Google Maps Street View
Station House (Interior) from Google Maps Street View
Platform from Google Maps Street View

Long Island Rail Road stations in Nassau County, New York
Railway stations in the United States opened in 1909
Railway stations in the United States opened in 1913
1913 establishments in New York (state)